Portable Game Notation (PGN) is a standard plain text format for recording chess games (both the moves and related data), which can be read by humans and is also supported by most chess software.

History
PGN was devised around 1993, by Steven J. Edwards, and was first popularized and specified via the Usenet newsgroup rec.games.chess.

Usage
PGN is structured "for easy reading and writing by human users and for easy parsing and generation by computer programs." The chess moves themselves are given in algebraic chess notation using English initials for the pieces. The filename extension is .pgn.

There are two formats in the PGN specification, the "import" format and the "export" format. The import format describes data that may have been prepared by hand, and is intentionally lax; a program that can read PGN data should be able to handle the somewhat lax import format. The export format is rather strict and describes data prepared under program control, similar to a pretty printed source program reformatted by a compiler. The export format representations generated by different programs on the same computer should be exactly equivalent, byte for byte.

PGN text begins with a set of "tag pairs" (a tag name and its value), followed by the "movetext" (chess moves with optional commentary).

Tag pairs 

Tag pairs begin with an initial left bracket , followed by the name of the tag in plain ASCII text. The tag value is enclosed in double-quotes, and the tag is then terminated with a closing right bracket . A quote inside a tag value is represented by the backslash immediately followed by a quote. A backslash inside a tag value is represented by two adjacent backslashes. There are no special control codes involving escape characters, or carriage returns, and linefeeds to separate the fields, and superfluous embedded spaces are usually skipped when parsing.

Seven Tag Roster 
PGN data for archival storage is required to provide seven tag pairs – together known as the "Seven Tag Roster". In export format, these tag pairs must appear before any other tag pairs and in this order:

Optional tag pairs 
The standard allows for other optional tag pairs. The more common ones include:

Movetext 

The movetext describes the actual moves of the game. This includes move number indicators (numbers followed by either one or three periods; one if the next move is White's move, three if the next move is Black's move) and movetext in Standard Algebraic Notation (SAN).

For most moves the SAN consists of the letter abbreviation for the piece, an x if there is a capture, and the two-character algebraic name of the final square the piece moved to. The letter abbreviations are K (king), Q (queen), R (rook), B (bishop), and N (knight). The pawn is given an empty abbreviation in SAN movetext, but in other contexts the abbreviation P is used. The algebraic name of any square is as per usual algebraic chess notation; from white's perspective, the leftmost square closest to white is a1, the rightmost square closest to the white is h1, and the rightmost (from white's perspective) square closest to black side is h8.

In a few cases, a more detailed representation is needed to resolve ambiguity; if so, the piece's file letter, numerical rank, or the exact square is inserted after the moving piece's name (in that order of preference). Thus, Nge2 specifies that the knight originally on the g-file moves to e2.

SAN kingside castling is indicated by the sequence O-O; queenside castling is indicated by the sequence O-O-O (note that these are capital Os, not zeroes, contrary to the FIDE standard for notation). Pawn promotions are notated by appending = to the destination square, followed by the piece the pawn is promoted to. For example: e8=Q. If the move is a checking move, 
+ is also appended; if the move is a checkmating move, # is appended instead. For example: e8=Q#.

An annotator who wishes to suggest alternative moves to those actually played in the game may insert variations enclosed in parentheses. They may also comment on the game by inserting Numeric Annotation Glyphs (NAGs) into the movetext. Each NAG reflects a subjective impression of the move preceding the NAG or of the resultant position.

If the game result is anything other than *, the result is repeated at the end of the movetext.

Comments 
Comments do not nest.

Example 
Here is the PGN format of the 29th game of the 1992 match played in Yugoslavia between Bobby Fischer and Boris Spassky:

Handling chess variants 
Many chess variants can be recorded using PGN, provided the names of the pieces can be limited to one character, usually a letter and not a number. They are typically noted with a tag named "Variant" giving the name of the rules. The term "Variation" must be avoided, as that refers to the name of an opening variation. Note that traditional chess programs can only handle, at most, a few variants. Forsyth-Edwards Notation is used to record the starting position for variants (such as Chess960) which have initial positions other than the orthodox chess initial position.

See also 
 X-FEN
 Smart Game Format – Format for recording go games
 Portable Draughts Notation

References 

Chess notation
Computer file formats
1993 introductions